The pro-Beijing camp, pro-establishment camp, pro-government camp or pro-China camp refers to a political alignment in Hong Kong which generally supports the policies of the Beijing central government and the Chinese Communist Party (CCP) towards Hong Kong. The term "pro-establishment camp" is regularly in use to label the broader segment of the Hong Kong political arena which has the closer relationship with the establishment, namely the governments of the People's Republic of China (PRC) and the Hong Kong Special Administrative Region (HKSAR). It is labeled the "Patriotic Front" by pro-Beijing media and "loyalists" by the rival pro-democracy camp.

The pro-Beijing camp evolved from Hong Kong's pro-CCP faction, often called "leftists", which acted under the direction of the CCP. It launched the 1967 Hong Kong riots against British colonial rule in Hong Kong and had a long rivalry with the pro-Kuomintang bloc. After the Sino-British Joint Declaration was signed in 1984, affirming Chinese sovereignty over Hong Kong from 1997, the traditional leftists realigned itself and unofficially formed a loose "United Front" with the conservative pro-business elites to counter the emergence of the pro-democracy camp in the 1990s and ensure a smooth transition of the Hong Kong sovereignty in Beijing's interest.

Since the handover in 1997, the pro-Beijing camp has become the major supporting force of the Hong Kong government and maintained control of the Legislative Council of Hong Kong (LegCo), having the advantage of indirectly elected functional constituencies. Going into the 2010s, the pro-Beijing camp underwent a period of diversification in which different parties emerged and targeted different voters which resulted in steady increases of the support. With various positions on specific issues, the camp generally embraces conservative values politically, socially and economically, and Chinese nationalistic and patriotic sentiments. However, the unpopular SAR administrations and opposition to Beijing's policies toward Hong Kong have also caused the camp major losses in the 2003 and 2019 elections.

Names
The term "pro-Beijing camp" refers to the political alignment which supports the policies of the Beijing, where the seat of the Government of the People's Republic of China is. Therefore, "pro-Beijing camp" is sometimes referred to as "pro-China camp".

The faction in the pro-Beijing camp which evolved from the "traditional leftists" was also known as the "pro-communists", while the business elites and professionals who were appointed by the colonial government before 1997 were called the "pro-government camp". In the 1990s when the traditional leftists and business elites unofficially formed the loose "United Front" towards the handover in 1997, "pro-Beijing camp" has become a broader term for the whole segment. The term "pro-government camp" has also been used to describe the same segment which support the SAR government. During the unpopular administration of Chief Executive Tung Chee-hwa, the hardcore pro-government parties, mainly the Democratic Alliance for the Betterment of Hong Kong (DAB), were labelled "loyalists" by the pro-democracy camp. In recent years, a more neutral term "pro-establishment camp" is regularly in use, especially in Chinese media.

Ideology

The pro-Beijing camp members are united by the political ideology of being closer to Beijing government, as much out of conviction as of pragmatism, but vary on other issues within the context of Hong Kong. Some pro-Beijing factions, including the "traditional leftists" who evolved from their Marxist-Leninist and Maoist conviction in the 1960s and 70s often hold a strong sentiment of patriotism and Chinese nationalism. They have had a years-long tradition of following the orders of the CCP, many of whom were also alleged underground members of the Communist Party.

Amongst pragmatists, especially among the pro-business elites and tycoons who have been absorbed into Beijing's "United Front", have enjoyed political power and privileges, as well as economic interests, from the present political system and their close ties with the Beijing authorities. Some moderates also hope that in conceding on those issues on which China will not compromise, preserving as much as possible in the way of personal liberties and local autonomy can be achieved.

The rhetoric of the pro-Beijing camp is mostly concerned with patriotism, social stability and economic prosperity. The pro-Beijing camp generally supports universal suffrage in Hong Kong under Beijing's framework, under which only Beijing-designated "patriots" may govern Hong Kong, although the most conservative faction opposes increased democratic development in Hong Kong with the introduction of universal suffrage and see in it the creation of instability.

History

Pro-CCP leftists 

The pro-Beijing camp evolved from the pro-CCP faction in Hong Kong which existed since the establishment of the CCP. The 1922 Seamen's strike, led by the Chinese Seamen's Union and the 1925–26 Canton–Hong Kong strike, led by various left-wing labour unions, were the two major Communist-related labour movements in the British colony of Hong Kong. During the Japanese occupation of Hong Kong, the Communist East River guerillas were active in the Pearl River Delta.

The Hong Kong and Kowloon Federation of Trade Unions (FTU), an umbrella trade union for the local left-wing unions, was founded in April 1948. After the Communist victory in the Chinese Civil War, the local communists remained in their semi-underground status. In the early post-war days, the Hong Kong and Kowloon Federation of Trade Unions, the Chinese General Chamber of Commerce and the Hong Kong Chinese Reform Association became the three pillars of the local pro-CCP organs, following the orders of the New China News Agency, the de facto Communist China's representative in Hong Kong. Their rivals were the pro-Nationalist faction, who pledged allegiance to the Nationalist government on Taiwan. The FTU took a leading role in the Hong Kong 1967 Leftist Riots, which, inspired by the Cultural Revolution in the Mainland, aimed at overthrowing the British colonial rule in Hong Kong. The leftists lost their prestige after the riots for a period of time as the general public was against the violence attributed to the leftists, although the presence of the pro-Beijing Maoist elements remained strong in the universities and colleges throughout the 1970s, in which many of the pro-CCP university and college graduates became the backbones of the pro-Beijing camp today.

Transition period 
After the Sino-British Joint Declaration in 1984, the pro-CCP organisations became active again, of which many of them were appointed to various positions relating to the transition of the sovereignty of Hong Kong. The Beijing government also appointed many Hong Kong tycoons and professionals to sit on the Hong Kong Basic Law Consultative Committee (BLCC) and the Hong Kong Basic Law Drafting Committee (BLDC) as the means of forming a united front. To ensure the post-1997 political system would be dominated by business and professional interests, the Business and Professional Group of the Basic Law Consultative Committee was formed in April 1986 to propose a conservative, less democratic proposal of Group of 89 for electing the Chief Executive and Legislative Council, in contrast to the more progressive proposal of the pro-democracy activists. Several new political parties, including the New Hong Kong Alliance (NHKA) founded in 1989 by Lo Tak-shing from the conservative wing and the Business and Professionals Federation of Hong Kong (BPF) founded in 1990 by Vincent Lo from the mainstream wing, evolved from the group. The Liberal Democratic Federation of Hong Kong (LDF) consisted of the pro-government elected officeholders in which Maria Tam was the key person was also formed in 1990 in preparation for the first direct elections to the Legislative Council in 1991.

The Tiananmen Square protests of 1989 sparked pro-democracy sentiments in Hong Kong. The newly formed democratic party, the United Democrats of Hong Kong, enjoyed landslide victories in the District Boards election, Urban and Regional Council election and Legislative Council election in 1991. To counter the pro-democracy influence in the legislature, the British-appointed unofficial members of the Legislative Council launched the Co-operative Resources Centre (CRC) in 1991 which transformed into the pro-business conservative Liberal Party in 1993, becoming the arch rival of the United Democrats. In 1992, the traditional leftists also formed the Democratic Alliance for the Betterment of Hong Kong (DAB) under the direction of the Hong Kong and Macau Affairs Office. In 1994, a group of businessmen and professionals founded the Hong Kong Progressive Alliance (HKPA) under the direction of the New China News Agency.

The large-scale democratisation initiated by then Governor Chris Patten resulted in the deterioration of Sino-British relations and led to the emergence of an "unholy alliance" of pro-Beijing businesspeople and leftist loyalists versus the pro-democratic popular alliance. The Liberal Party led by Allen Lee launched a campaign attempting to defeat Patten's proposal which was backed by Beijing despite its eventual failure. Despite this, in the broadened franchise, the pro-Beijing camp was again defeated by the pro-democracy camp in the 1995 Legislative Council election. The Beijing government argued that the electoral reform introduced by Patten had violated the Joint Declaration, and thus they would scrap the reforms upon resumption of sovereignty. In preparation, a parallel legislature, the Provisional Legislative Council, was set up in 1996 under the control of pro-Beijing camp, and it introduced as the Legislative Council upon the founding of the new SAR government in 1997.

Early post-handover years 
Since 1997, the pro-Beijing camp has never lost a majority in LegCo, controlling LegCo through a collaboration of the pro-Beijing groups with their support within the functional constituencies. In 2002, Chief Executive Tung Chee-hwa formed a governing alliance with the DAB and Liberal Party, the two largest pro-Beijing parties in the legislature, by inviting the two chairmen, Jasper Tsang and James Tien, to the Executive Council. On 1 July 2003, a peaceful crowd of more than 500,000 protested against the introduction of controversial legislation under Article 23 of the Basic Law. James Tien, chairman of the Liberal Party and member of the Executive Council, forced the government to delay the second reading of the bill. The stance of the DAB on Article 23 and their blind support for the Tung Chee-hwa's administration were strongly criticised and led to their losses in the District Council election.

In 2005, veteran civil servant Donald Tsang succeeded the unpopular Tung Chee-hwa stepped down as Chief Executive in Beijing's direction. The pro-government camp supported the Tsang government, even though some traditional leftists questioned Tsang's background in the colonial civil service. After the setbacks in 2003, the pro-Beijing camp won back seats lost in 2003 in the 2007 District Council election, in which the DAB became the largest victor. The DAB enjoyed another victory in 2011 District Council election. In the Hong Kong legislative election, 2012, the pro-Beijing camp won more than half of the geographical constituency seats respectively in Hong Kong Island, Kowloon West and New Territories West, narrowing the number of seats held in the geographical constituencies between pro-Beijing and pro-democrats to 17 seats and 18 seats respectively. The pro-Beijing camp retained control of the Legislative Council and the DAB remained the largest party with 13 seats in total.

Since the late 2000s, the pro-Beijing camp has expanded its spectrum of support from pro-business elites and traditional leftists to those from a broader background. The former Secretary for Security Regina Ip, who was in charge of introducing the Basic Law Article 23 stood in the Hong Kong Island by-election in 2007 against the former Chief Secretary Anson Chan supported by the pro-democrats. Despite her defeat, she was able to be elected in the 2008 Legislative Council election, and formed the middle class and professional oriented New People's Party in 2011. Some pro-Beijing legal professionals who ran as independents, such as Priscilla Leung, Paul Tse and Junius Ho were elected to the Legislative Council in recent elections, which were seen receiving support from the Liaison Office, which was viewed growing influence in Hong Kong's domestic affairs. On the other hand, the FTU, which operated as the sister organisation of the DAB, began to run under its own banner, taking a more pro-labour and pro-grassroots stance as compared to the DAB's big-tent position.

2012 Chief Executive election and aftermath 
Two pro-Beijing candidates ran for the Chief Executive election in 2012, with the Chief Secretary Henry Tang and the Convenor of the Executive Council, Leung Chun-ying using scandals, dirty tactics and smears on each other. With fierce competition deeply dividing the pro-Beijing camp into the Tang camp and the Leung camp, Leung eventually won the election with the support of the Liaison Office. After the election, Beijing called for a reconciliation of the two camps.

In late 2012, some pro-Leung advocacy groups with the allegations of Beijing's financial supports began to emerge such as Voice of Loving Hong Kong, Caring Hong Kong Power and Hong Kong Youth Care Association, which launched counter-protests against the pan-democrats. The Leung Chun-ying administration with its hardline stance on the growing movement for Hong Kong independence after the 2014 Umbrella Revolution was strongly criticised by the pro-democrats and some pro-Beijing moderates. James Tien, a keen supporter of Henry Tang in 2012 became a leading critic of Leung. He was stripped from his Chinese People's Political Consultative Conference (CPPCC) office during the 2014 protests after he asked Leung to step down. In the 2015 District Council and 2016 Legislative Council elections, the pro-democrats and localists scored better-than expected victories over the pro-Beijing camp. In December 2016, Leung Chun-ying announced he would not seek re-election.

The two top officials, Chief Secretary for Administration Carrie Lam and Financial Secretary John Tsang emerged as front runners in the 2017 Chief Executive election after Leung's announcement. Both resigned from their posts; while Lam's resignation was approved by the central government within days, Tsang's resignation was delayed for a month, which sparked the speculation that Tsang was not Beijing's favoured candidate. With the active lobbying by the Liaison Office, Lam received 580 nominations from the 1,194-member Election Committee, while Tsang struggled to get enough nominations from the pro-Beijing electors and had to rely on the pro-democracy camp. Lam went on to win the election with 777 votes, beating Tsang's 365 votes and retired judge Woo Kwok-hing's 21 votes.

The pro-Beijing camp formed a united front in the 2018 Legislative Council by-election. It took two of the four vacancies left by the 2016 Legislative Council oath-taking controversy, by taking the Kowloon West geographical constituency and Architectural, Surveying, Planning and Landscape functional constituency from the pro-democrats and localists. Vincent Cheng of the DAB narrowly defeated Yiu Chung-yim who was disqualified from the Legislative Council in the oath-taking controversy, becoming the first pro-Beijing candidate to win in a single-member district election since the handover.

Convenor 
Convenor of the pro-Beijing camp is also known as the "class monitor" by the local media. The convenor usually speaks on behalf of the camp, co-ordinates the camp on communication and voting (similar to whipping), and draws up the duty roster to avoid quorum not met.

 7th Legislative Council: Martin Liao
 6th Legislative Council: Martin Liao
 5th Legislative Council: Ip Kwok-him (gave up power after chaotic voting on electoral reform)
 5th Legislative Council and before: Tam Yiu-chung

Political parties
 The Democratic Alliance for the Betterment and Progress of Hong Kong (DAB), is the largest pro-Beijing party founded by a group of traditional leftists in 1992 with sustainable grassroots support. The image of leftists has faded over time since its merger with the pro-business Hong Kong Progressive Alliance (HKPA) in 2005 and more young professionals take place in the party leadership. 
 Business and Professionals Alliance for Hong Kong (BPA), is the leading party for the pro-business sector in the Legislative Council. Formed by Economic Synergy, a breakaway group from the Liberal Party, and Professional Forum , a parliamentary group with functional constituency legislators, it was established in 2012 and has become the second-largest force in the legislature.
 Hong Kong Federation of Trade Unions (FTU), is the traditional leftist labour union which co-founded the DAB in 1992. It positions itself with a pro-labour and patriotic agenda and has been separated from the DAB and actively participated in elections under its own banner in recent years. 
 Liberal Party, is the pro-business party formed in 1993 by a group of legislators who had been appointed by the British Governor and functional constituency members. It has a large support from the business sector and adopts an economic liberal and liberal conservative ideology.
 New People's Party, is a party founded by Regina Ip who caters at middle class and civil servant interests.
 Federation of Hong Kong and Kowloon Labour Unions, is a small labour union which has a seat in the legislature through the Labour functional constituency.
 New Century Forum, is a political group and think tank founded in 1999 which dedicates to middle class interests. The only representative of the group in the Legislative Council is convenor Ma Fung-kwok.
 Professional Power, many candidates were not challenged by any parties or independent politicians from the pro-Beijing camp in 2019 Hong Kong local elections. Prior to the polling day, there was a list widely circulated in LIHKG and Factcheck.io. The list claimed itself as a list of candidates endorsed by Hong Kong Federation of Trade Unions. The list has included six candidates from the Professional Power.

Evolution of parties

Advocacy groups
Following the election of CY Leung as Chief Executive of Hong Kong, public discontent manifested itself in the form of mass petitions, rallies and demonstrations, so much so that it seemed that a plurality of the Hong Kong public was anti-Leung. In late 2012 pro-Leung advocacy groups began to emerge such as Voice of Loving Hong Kong, Caring Hong Kong Power and Hong Kong Youth Care Association, the fact that all these groups feature the Chinese character for love in the names has led to these groups to be called the "love Hong Kong faction". The word love in this context is taken from the lexicon of political debate in mainland China, were the slogan "Love China, Love the Party", is seen as the basis of patriotism, and the demand that any future Chief Executive of Hong Kong must "Love China, Love Hong Kong".

These supposedly grassroots organisations present themselves as being a spontaneous reaction to the excesses of the pan-democracy camp, as Hong Kong's silent majority who wish for a prosperous, harmonious society and who reject the "social violence" of the pan-democrats. Describing themselves as apolitical and independent of outside powers, these groups use various tactics to counter the pan-democrats, including counter rallies and marches in opposition to pan-democrat ones, counter petitions, and making accusations of campaign fund fraud and irregularities against pan-democrat politicians to the Independent Commission Against Corruption. They also make use of mass heckling at pan-democracy forums to silence debate.

Outside commentators suspect that these groups are orchestrated by China's Liaison Office in Hong Kong pointing to a use of language that parrots Beijing's and an antipathy to Falun Gong which mirrors Beijing's own political line. Whether directly or not these organisations have received support from Beijing through the United Front Work Department, with employees of Chinese companies based in Hong Kong, being asked to sign petitions and attend rallies, and members of hometown societies being paid to do the same.

During the 2014 Hong Kong protests, on mid-October 2014, the "love Hong Kong faction" took to wearing a blue ribbon as a counter to the protesters yellow one. It is alleged that it is the "love Hong Kong faction" that has organised counter protests and who attempted to charge through pan-democracy protesters in Causeway Bay.

During the 2019–20 Hong Kong protests, Safeguard Hong Kong Alliance and Politihk Social Strategic have organised protests either in support of the government's extradition bill or the Hong Kong Police.

Alleged Triad involvement 
During the 2012 Chief Executive election campaign, Leung's campaign officers were seen attending a dinner in Lau Fau Shan with Kwok Wing-hung, nicknamed “Shanghai Boy”, an alleged former leader of the local triad Wo Shing Wo. The content of the meeting remained unknown to the public.

In a town hall meeting on 11 August 2013 in Tin Shui Wai, where Leung attended, some thug-like supporters of Leung allegedly provoked and beat up protesters. Leung Che-cheung, chairman of the New Territories Association of Societies (NTAS)  and Legislative Council member of the Democratic Alliance for the Betterment and Progress of Hong Kong (DAB) who hosted the town hall meeting invited a group of triad-related individuals to a dinner party and  called in supporters to support Leung prior to the meeting. Tang Sui-man, also known as "Four Eyes Man", representative of the villagers from Wang Toi Shan Ho Lik Pui Tsuen, Tsang Shu-wo, also known as "Tall Man Wo", chairman of Ping Shan Heung Rural Committee and a number of powerful triad related individuals were called into action.

During the 2014 Hong Kong protests, the armed anti-Occupy protesters beat up Occupy protesters in the Mong Kok occupation site. The student protesters accused the government and the police of allowing gangs to attack them as there was no uniformed police in the scene during the event. Democratic Party legislator James To also accused that "the [Hong Kong] government has used organised, orchestrated forces and even triad gangs in [an] attempt to disperse citizens."

During the 2019 Hong Kong protests, a mob of over 100 armed men dressed in white indiscriminately attacked civilians on the streets and passengers in the Yuen Long MTR station on 21 July including the elderly, children, black-clad protesters, journalists and lawmakers. At least 45 people were injured in the incident, including a pregnant woman. Pro-Beijing legislator Junius Ho was seen in various videos posted online greeting the white-clothed group of assailants, shaking their hands and calling the suspected gangsters "heroes", giving them thumbs-up and saying to them "thank you for your hard work." At least one of the white-clothed men who shook hands with Ho has been shown to have been inside Yuen Long Station during the attacks.

Electoral performance

Chief Executive elections

Legislative Council elections

District Council elections

See also
 Liaison Office (Hong Kong)
 Pro-Beijing camp (Macau)

References

Political party alliances in Hong Kong
Politics of Hong Kong